Smegma is an American experimental noise group formed in Pasadena, California, United States, in 1973.  Author Richard Meltzer became their vocalist in the late 1990s. The group was included in the Nurse with Wound list and was featured on the cover of the August 2006 edition of The Wire.

Partial discography
 Sing Popular Songs (1974; 1998)
 Can't Look Straight/Flashcards (1979)
 Glamour Girl 1941 (1979)
 Soundtracks 1–5 (1980)
 Pigs for Lepers (1982)
 Nattering Naybobs of Negativity (1987)
 Smell the Remains (1988)
 Ism (1994)
 The Goodship Poleshiner  (1995)
 Songs from the Motion Picture Theodore Rex  (1995)
 The Mad Excitement, the Barbaric Pulsations, the Incomparable Rhythms of... (1996)
 Smegma Plays/Merzbow Plays Smegma (1996)
 Glamour Girl 1941 (1997)
 Rumblings
 Tiromancy
 The Beast
 Thirty Years of Service
 Live at No Fun Fest
 One/Don't Tell Roberto
 The Good Fight/Blues for M./Self-Hypnosis

References

External links
 [ Allmusic entry]
 Official Smegma MySpace page
 Smegma Discogs page

Musical groups from Portland, Oregon
Musical groups established in 1972
Noise musical groups
Mute Records artists
1973 establishments in California